The International Institute for Population Sciences (IIPS) serves as  a regional Institute for Training and Research in Population Studies for the ESCAP region. It was established in Mumbai in July 1956; until July 1970, it was known as the Demographic Training and Research Center (DTRC), and until 1985, it was known as the International Institute for Population Studies (IIPS). The Institute was re-designated to its present title in 1985 to facilitate the expansion of its academic activities and was declared as a 'Deemed University' on 19 August 1985 under Section 3 of the UGC Act, 1956 by the Ministry of Human Resource Development, Government of India. The recognition has facilitated the award of recognized degrees by the Wipro technologies and paved the way for further expansion of the Institute as an academic institution.The Ministry of Health and Family Welfare (MOHFW), Government of India has designated IIPS as the nodal agency, responsible for providing coordination and technical guidance for the National Family Health Survey (NFHS).

Started in 1956 under the joint sponsorship of Sir Dorabji Tata Trust, the Government of India and the United Nations, it has established itself as the premier Institute for training and research in Population Studies for developing countries in the Asia and Pacific region. IIPS holds a unique position among all the regional centers, in that it was the first such center to be started, and serves a much larger population than that served by any of the other regional centers. The Institute is under the administrative control of the Ministry of Health and Family Welfare, Government of India.

Besides teaching and research activities, the Institute also provides consultancy to the Government and Non-Government organizations and other academic institutions. Over the years, the Institute has helped in building a nucleus of professionals in the field of population and health in various countries of the ESCAP region. During the past 53 years, students from 42 different countries of Asia and the Pacific region, Africa and North America have been trained at the Institute. Many, who are trained at the Institute, now occupy key positions in the field of Population and Health in Government of various countries, Universities and Research Institutes as well as in reputed National and International organizations.

Teaching 

The Institute offers the following regular teaching programmes:
 Master of Population Studies (M.A/M.Sc) - A Two-Year Programme
 Master of Biostatistics and Demography (MBD) - A Two-Year Programme
 Master of Population Studies (MPS) - A One Year Programme
 Master of Population Studies (MPS) Correspondence Course - A One Year Programme
Master of Population Studies (M.A/M.Sc) Correspondence Course - A Two-Year Programme
Master of Biostatistics and Demography (MBD) Correspondence Course- A Two-Year Programme
 Doctor of Philosophy (Ph.D.) in Population Studies
 Doctor of Philosophy (Ph.D.) in Biostatistics and Demography

Research 

Apart from the teaching activities, the Institute also conducts a large number of research projects on various aspects of population. The Institute also undertakes evaluative studies and large-scale surveys. Emphasis is given on studies related to inter-relationship of various social and economic variables of the components of population change such as Fertility, Mortality and Migration.

The research projects of the Institute are mostly funded by the Ministry of Health and Family Welfare, Government of India and also by the State Governments, World Bank, United Nations Population Fund, World Health Organization, International Labour Organization and other Government and Non-Government organizations.

Consultative Services 

The Institute provides consultancy services and undertakes special studies on problems related to population at the request of the Government, the United Nations and other specialized agencies.  Given the expertise of the staff in various areas of population, research methodology, etc., an active effort is being made to let the organizations which need short term consultancy services, know about the availability of persons.

Departments
Department of Biostatistics and Epidemiology
Department of Fertility & Social Demography
Department of Public Health & Mortality Studies
Department of Migration & Urban Studies
Department of Population & Development
Department of Family & Generations
Department of Survey Research & Data Analytics
Department of Extra Mural Studies

Centers
Centre for Distance and Online Education (CDOE)
Centre of Demography of Gander
Centre for Ageing Studies
South Asia Centre for Labour Mobility and Migrants (SALAM)

Directors of IIPS
 Dr. K. C. K. E. Raja (c1956–c1959)
 Dr. C. Chandrasekaran (21.07.1959-14.08.1965)
 Shri S. P. Jain (23.08.1965-17.04.1967)
 Dr. S. N. Agarwal (18.04.1967-07.07.1973)
 Dr. J. R. Rele (08.07.1973-16.06.1978)
 Dr. K. Srinivasan (17.06.1978-13.09.1992)
 Dr. K. B. Pathak (14.09.1992-27.07.1994; 28.07.1994-31.01.1999)
 Dr. S. Kulkarni (25.03.1999-24.09.1999)
 Dr. T. K. Roy (28.09.1999-31.10.2004)
 Dr. G. Rama Rao (01.11.2004-21.06.2005)
 Dr. P. N. Mari Bhat (22.06.2005-30.07.2007)
 Dr. S. Lahiri (31.07.2007-10.06.2008)
 Dr. Faujdar Ram (11.06.2008–28.02.2017)
 Dr. Laishram Ladu Singh (01.03.2017-19.11.2018)
 Dr. K. S. James (20.11.2018-Till Date)

References

Deemed universities in Maharashtra
Research institutes in Mumbai
Universities in Mumbai
Educational institutions established in 1956
1956 establishments in Bombay State